Hallgarten is a surname.

Hallgarten may also refer to:
 Hallgarten (Pfalz), a municipality in Rhineland-Palatinate, Germany
 Hallgarten (Rheingau), a Stadtteil of Oestrich-Winkel, Hesse, Germany
 Hallgarten Prize, a design prize won by George Henry Bogert among others
 Hallgarten Hall, a Dartmouth College building